British singer-songwriter Ellie Goulding has won 30 awards from 74 nominations. Among her awards, Goulding has seventeen BMI London Awards (including the BMI President's Awards), two Brit Awards, a Billboard Music Award, two Glamour Awards, one MTV Italian Music Award, an NRJ Music Award, a People's Choice Award, an Q Award, a Teen Choice Award and Variety's Decade Award. Goulding received a nomination for Best Pop Solo Performance at the 58th Grammy Awards. At the 2019 ceremony she was honored by the Variety Hitmakers Awards with the Decade Award.

For her constant activism on climate-change awareness and support to LGBTQ+ community, Goulding has been honored with the Ally Award by the Attitude Awards, the Global Leadership Award (2017) and named Humanitarian of the Year (2022) by the United Nations Foundation and in the TIME 100 Impact Awards with the Impact Award.

Attitude Awards 
The Attitude Awards showcase the very best of the global LGBTQ community and give a platform to role models while supporting the Attitude Magazine Foundation, which raises money for LGBT causes.

Goulding has been honored with the Ally Award at the 2022 Virgin Atlantic Attitude Awards.

BBC Music Awards 
The BBC Music Awards are the BBC's inaugural pop music awards, first held in December 2015, as a celebration of the musical achievements over the past 12 months. The live award ceremony, broadcast simultaneously across BBC One, BBC Radio 1 and BBC Radio 2, was held at London's Earl's Court on 11 December 2014 and presented by BBC Radio's Chris Evans and Fearne Cotton.

BBC Sound of... 
The BBC Sound of... is an annual poll by music critics and industry figures with the purpose to find the most promising new music talent. A 10-strong longlist is published at the end of the year, with a ranked shortlist and annual winner announced the following January. Ellie Goulding was named the Sound of 2010, coming in first place. She made history as the second artist to won the BBC Sound of... and Critics' Choice Award at the 2010 Brit Awards, both in the same year, with the first being Adele.

Billboard Music Awards 
The Billboard Music Awards are held to honor artists for commercial performance in the U.S., based on record charts published by Billboard. The awards are based on sales data by Nielsen SoundScan and radio information by Nielsen Broadcast Data Systems. Goulding has received a total of 6 nominations with one win.

BMI Awards 
The BMI Awards are held annually by Broadcast Music, Inc. to award songwriters in various genres. Ellie Goulding, has won a total of 17 BMI Awards.

In 2022, Goulding was honoured with the prestigious BMI President’s Award.

BMI London Awards

Brit Awards 
The Brit Awards (sometimes stylised as the BRIT Awards; often simply called the Brits) are the British Phonographic Industry's annual pop music awards, and the British equivalent of the American Grammy Awards. Ellie Goulding has won twice out of 11 nominations.

British LGBT Awards 

!Ref.
|-
| 2019
| rowspan=2|Ellie Goulding 
| rowspan=2|Celebrity Ally
| 
| 
|-
| 2022
| 
|

BT Digital Music Awards 
The BT Digital Music Awards (DMA) was a British music award ceremony held annually for 10 years from 2002 to 2011 (with no ceremony in 2009). Music industry professionals nominated artists, venues and hardware into the Judge's Choice award categories. The rest of the awards were made up of People's Choice Awards, voted for by the public. Goulding has 3 nominations.

Cosmopolitan's Ultimate Women of the Year Awards

Danish Music Awards 
The Danish Music Awards (DMA) is a Danish award show. The show has been arranged by IFPI since 1989, and was originally called IFPI-prisen ("IFPI-Award") until 1991, when it changed its name to Dansk Grammy ("Danish Grammy"). The current name was given in 2001, after the American Grammy Awards registered the name Grammy as their trademark. Goulding has 1 Nominated.

Latin American Music Awards 
The Latin American Music Awards (Latin AMAs) is an annual American music award to be presented by Telemundo. It is the Spanish-language counterpart of the American Music Awards (AMAs) produced by the Dick Clark Productions. Goulding received one nomination.

Los Premios 40 Principales 
Los Premios 40 Principales is an award show by the musical radio station Los 40 Principales. Created in 2006 to celebrate the fortieth anniversary of the founding of the worldwide station. Ellie has received two awards out of two nominations.

Glamour Awards 
The Glamour Awards is hosted by Glamour magazine every year to hand out different awards to honor extraordinary and inspirational women from a variety of fields, including entertainment, business, sports, music, science, medicine, education, and politics. Ellie has won twice.

Global Awards
The Global Awards celebrate the stars of music, news & entertainment across genres in the UK and from around the world. Ellie Goulding has received 3 nominations.

Harper's Bazaar Women of the Year Awards

Hungarian Music Awards

Jimmie Awards

Melhores do Ano Atrevida

MOBO Awards 
The MOBO Awards for "Music of Black Origin" were established in 1996 by Kanya King and Andy Ruffell. The MOBO Award show is held annually in the United Kingdom to recognise artists of any ethnicity or nationality performing black music. In 2009, the awards ceremony was held in Glasgow for the first time. Prior to that, it had been held in London. It was nominated once.

MP3 Music Awards

MTV Awards

MTV Video Music Awards 
An MTV Video Music Award (commonly abbreviated as a VMA) is an award presented by the cable channel MTV to honor the best in the music video medium. Originally conceived as an alternative to the Grammy Awards (in the video category), the annual MTV Video Music Awards ceremony has often been called the "Super Bowl for youth", an acknowledgment of the VMA ceremony's ability to draw millions of youth from teens to 20-somethings each year. Ellie was nominated three times.

MTV Europe Music Awards 
The MTV Europe Music Awards (EMAs or EMA) are an event presented by MTV Networks Europe which awards prizes to musicians and performers. Ellie was nominated five times.

MTV Italian Music Awards 
The TRL Awards were established in 2006 by MTV Italy to celebrate the most popular artists and music videos in Italy. Goulding has already won once.

NRJ Music Award

O Music Awards

People's Choice Awards

Q Awards

Radio Disney Music Awards

Spotify Awards

Teen Choice Awards

TIME 100 Impact Awards 
In March 2022, Ellie was the recipient of a TIME 100 Impact Award in recognition of her longstanding work toward advancing climate change awareness.

United Nations Foundation 
During the year of 2017, Goulding has been recognized by the United Nations Foundation with a Global Leadership Award for her environmental and social justice activism.

In October 2022, she was awarded with the Humanitarian of the Year Award by the United Nations Foundation in New York. Goulding was recognized for her work raising the profile of fossil fuel-funded conflicts, including in Ukraine, and her support for refugees from conflict zones and the frontline of the climate crisis.

With the Deputy Secretary-General stating: "Ms. Ellie Goulding has helped to inspire a new generation of environmental activists with passion and purpose to change mindsets away from nature-harming activities to nature-nurturing behaviour."

UK Festival Awards

Urban Music Awards

Variety Hitmakers Awards 
The Variety Hitmakers Awards recognizes the writers, producers, publishers, managers and executives who helped make — and break — the most consumed songs of the year.

At the 2019 ceremony, Ellie Goulding has been named the recipient of Variety’s Decade Award.

Virgin Media Music Awards

World Music Awards

Žebřík Music Awards

!Ref.
|-
| rowspan=2|2015
| rowspan=3|Ellie Goulding
| Best International Discovery
| 
| rowspan=3|
|-
| Best International Female
| 
|-
| 2016
| Best International Live
|

References

Goulding, Ellie